Coplas al viento is the first album from the Chilean musical group Conjunto Quelentaro. It was released in 1967 on the Odeón Chile label.

Track listing
Side A
 "Coplas al Viento" (Gastón Guzmán) [16:36]
 "Junto al Estero" (Del folklore) [3:28]

Side B
 "Soy de Barro" (Eladio López) [2:37]
 "El Letrado" (Eduardo Guzmán, Gastón Guzmán) [2:50]
 "Alma en Pena" (Eladio López) [2:08]
 "Mi Juana" (Del folklore) [2:43]
 "Oración del Minero" (Eduardo Guzmán, Gastón Guzmán) [3:35]
 "Allá en la Pampa Argentina" (Del folklore) [2:25]
 "Camino en Guando" (Eduardo Guzmán, Gastón Guzmán) [3:23]

References

1967 albums